Revivalism may refer to:

 Christian revival, increased spiritual interest or renewal in the life of a church congregation or society, with a local, national or global effect 
 Revivalism (architecture), the use of visual styles that consciously echo the style of a previous architectural era

See also
 Revival (disambiguation)
 Revivalist (disambiguation)